Fox 66 may refer to:

 WSMH, a television station (channel 66) licensed to serve Flint, Michigan, United States
 WFXP, a television station (channel 66) licensed to serve Erie, Pennsylvania, United States